Eli Peck Miller (1828 – 19 December 1912), best known as E. P. Miller was an American physician, hydrotherapist, vegetarian and natural hygiene advocate.

Biography

Miller was a 1862 graduate of the New York Hygeio-Therapeutic College and an 1864 graduate of Bellevue Hospital Medical College. Early in his career Miller worked with hydrotherapist Russell Trall. Miller was physician and proprietor of the New Hygienic Institution and Turkish Bath in New York City. The institution had electric, Roman and Turkish baths. 

Miller combined hydrotherapy with diet as complementary therapeutics. He opposed the use of alcohol and tobacco. Miller was a Christian who held the view that suffering was the result of sin and disease could be caused by eating the wrong foods. He recommended that his clients abstain from coffee, strong milk, pickles, spices and tea.

From 1865, Miller was the editor of The Herald of Health and Journal of Physical Culture. This journal was the successor of The Herald of Health edited by Russell Trall. In 1893, the journal changed title to the Journal of Hygiene and Herald of Health.

Miller died of pneumonia on 19 December 1912, aged 84.

Beliefs

Phrenology

Miller was a phrenologist and contributed articles to The Phrenological Journal and Science of Health. His hygienic institute conducted phrenological examinations. In 1875, Louisa May Alcott was one of his notable clients.

Spiritualism

Miller converted to spiritualism after attending seances of the Eddy brothers.

Vegetarianism

Miller became a vegetarian in 1850. He was a dyspeptic and stated that a vegetarian diet aided his recovery. He became interested in vegetarianism through reading the works of Russell Trall. In 1860, Miller spoke at the Eleventh Annual Meeting of the American Vegetarian Society.

In 1909, Miller wrote that "I am over half way to my 81st birthday. I have not eaten flesh, fish or fowl for many years. I do not use milk unless it is sterilized or pasteurized."

Selected publications

A Treatise on the Cause of Exhausted Vitality (New York: Gray & Green, 1867)
How to Bathe (New York: American News Company, 1869)
Dyspepsia (New York: Miller, Haynes & Company, 1870)
Vital Force (1869)
The Improved Turkish Bath (New York: Miller, Haynes & Company, 1870)
A Father's Advice (New York: E. P. Miller, 1881)
Food of Man Part 1, Part 2 (The Phrenological Journal and Science of Health, 1902)
Curing Consumption by the Use of the Juices of Vegetables (The Phrenological Journal and Science of Health, 1905)
Everlasting Life (The Phrenological Journal and Science of Health, 1905)
Making Vegetarians by the Millions (The Phrenological Journal and Science of Health, 1906)
The Natural Age of Man (The Phrenological Journal and Science of Health, 1906)
True Solution to the Money Question (1908)
What to Eat (The Vegetarian Magazine, 1908)

References

1828 births
1912 deaths
19th-century American physicians
American health and wellness writers
American spiritualists
American temperance activists
American vegetarianism activists
Anti-smoking activists
Hydrotherapists
Orthopaths
Naturopaths
People associated with physical culture
Phrenologists
Tea critics
Vitalists